Łukasz Gutkowski (born 21 March 1998) is a Polish modern pentathlete. He competed in the men's event at the 2020 Summer Olympics.

References

External links
 

1998 births
Living people
Polish male modern pentathletes
Modern pentathletes at the 2020 Summer Olympics
Olympic modern pentathletes of Poland
Sportspeople from Warsaw